Luke Philip McCormick (born 21 January 1999) is an English professional footballer who plays as a midfielder for Bristol Rovers.

Career

Chelsea
McCormick joined Chelsea at the age of six.

Shrewsbury Town (loan)
On 18 July 2019, McCormick signed a new three-year deal, which would keep him at the club until 2022. On the same day, he joined League One side Shrewsbury Town on a season-long loan. He was recommended to manager Sam Ricketts by former Chelsea player and current coach Joe Cole. On 3 August, he made his professional debut for "The Shrews" in a 1–0 home win over Portsmouth, during which he was substituted off for Josh Laurent after 53 minutes.

His loan spell came to an end on 2 January 2020.

Bristol Rovers (loan)
On 21 September 2020, McCormick joined Bristol Rovers on loan until the end of the season. On 26 September, he made his league debut as a starter against Doncaster Rovers, which ended in a 4–1 away loss. On 12 December 2020, he scored his first goal for the club, finishing from inside the box to score the second in a 3–0 victory over rivals Plymouth Argyle. On 19 January 2021, McCormick scored an impressive free kick to level the scores as Rovers came from 2–0 down to get back to 2–2 against Crewe Alexandra in a match they eventually lost 3–2, the goal being nominated for the league's January Goal of the Month award on 19 February, surprisingly winning the award a week later by public vote. On 5 April 2021, with Rovers deep in a relegation battle, McCormick scored a double as the Gas beat Doncaster Rovers, a result that saw Rovers end a five-match losing streak and keep their survival hopes alive, a performance which saw McCormick rated a perfect 10/10 by the Bristol Post. At the end of the season, he re-joined Chelsea when his loan spell was up.

AFC Wimbledon
On 2 July 2021, McCormick returned to League One, this time on a permanent basis, as he left the club he had played for since the age of six to sign for AFC Wimbledon. He scored on his debut for Wimbledon in a 2-1 win at Doncaster Rovers on 7 August 2021. Going into the final day of the season, AFC Wimbledon were three points from safety with a seven-goal swing required in order to survive relegation. A 4–3 home defeat to Accrington Stanley in their last match saw Wimbledon relegated to League Two, a second consecutive third-tier relegation for McCormick.

Bristol Rovers
After weeks of speculation that had seen McCormick left out of the matchday squads for AFC Wimbledon, McCormick returned to Bristol Rovers for an undisclosed fee on 24 August 2022, signing a three-year deal. He made his second debut for the club on 30 August from the bench in an EFL Trophy tie with Plymouth Argyle, scoring in the shootout defeat following a 1–1 draw. On 18 October 2022, McCormick scored his first goal since his return to the club in a 3–0 EFL Trophy victory over Swindon Town.

Career statistics

Honours

Individual
League One Goal of the Month: January 2021

References

1999 births
Living people
Sportspeople from Bury St Edmunds
English footballers
Association football midfielders
Chelsea F.C. players
Shrewsbury Town F.C. players
Bristol Rovers F.C. players
AFC Wimbledon players
English Football League players